Tory Island, or simply Tory (officially known by its Irish name Toraigh), is an island  off the north-west coast of County Donegal, Ireland, and is the most remote inhabited island of Ireland. The name means "place of steep rocky heights".

Language
The main spoken language on the island is Irish, although English is spoken as well, to communicate with visitors. Tory is part of the Donegal Gaeltacht, and Ulster Irish (Gaeilge Uladh) is the main Irish dialect in use.

Geography and transport

The 2016 census recorded a population of 119, a decrease from the 2011 population of 144. The population is distributed among four towns: An Baile Thoir (East Town), An Baile Thiar (West Town), An Lár (Middletown) and Úrbaile (Newtown).
Petrol and diesel are available from Tory Oil at prices significantly higher than on the mainland.

Tory has no airport, but it does have regular ferry connections from mainland County Donegal. The ferry operates daily all year round. It does not take cars, but holds up to 70 passengers. During the winter months, ferry crossings may not be possible on some days due to rough seas. However, between November and March a four-seater helicopter operates every other Thursday between Falcarragh and Tory.

History

Ancient history
In the apocryphal history of Ireland, Lebor Gabála Érenn, Tory Island was the site of Conand's Tower, the stronghold of the Fomorians, before they were defeated by the Nemedians in a great battle on the island. The later Fomorian king, Balor of the evil eye, also lived here. Balor would imprison Ethlinn in a tower built atop Tor Mór (or Túr Mór in Old Irish, meaning The High Tower). Tor Mór is the island's highest point.

A monastery was founded on Tory in the 6th century by Colmcille. The monastery dominated life on the island until 1595, when it was plundered and destroyed by English troops, who were waging a war of suppression against local chieftains. (The monastery's bell tower, built in the 6th or 7th century, is the largest structure to have survived.)

Early modern history
In 1608, in what is known as the Siege of Tory Island (one of the final incidents of O'Doherty's Rebellion), a group of the surviving rebels took shelter in the castle on the island, but began killing each other in hopes of securing a pardon.

The final action in the Irish Rebellion of 1798, the naval Battle of Tory Island, took place in the sea just off the island.

Recent history
The first battleship the British lost during the First World War, the super-dreadnought  (23,400 tons), was sunk off Tory Island on 27 October 1914 by a naval mine that had been laid by the armed German merchant-cruiser Berlin. The loss was kept an official secret in Britain until 14 November 1918 (three days after the end of the war).

Since the 1950s, the island has been home to a small community of artists, and has its own art gallery. The English artist Derek Hill (d. 2000) was associated with the Tory artist community.

In keeping with a long-standing tradition, a "king" is chosen by consensus of the islanders. The most recent "King of Tory" (in Irish, Rí Thoraí) was the painter Patsy Dan Rodgers (Patsaí Dan Mac Ruaidhrí), who held the post from the 1990s until his death on 19 October 2018. The king has no legal power, but has duties that include acting as a spokesperson for the island community and welcoming people to the island.

Power is generated on the island today by three diesel electricity generators. These have a total capacity of 4 MW and burn through approximately 500 litres of fuel every day.

In 2009, the island gained attention from local and international news outlets when a resident was awarded damages against a neighbour for demolition and removal of his house in 1993. The house had gradually disappeared over a nine-month period, while the owner worked in New Zealand. On his return, and with the house completely removed and replaced with a car park, his questions and the subsequent investigations by the police were reportedly met with a "wall of silence" from other residents. The story was featured in a book in 2012 and a BBC podcast in 2021, both titled "The House That Vanished".

In 2015, the island's only café was destroyed by fire.

Demographics
The table below reports data on Tory Island's population, taken from Discover the Islands of Ireland (Alex Ritsema, Collins Press, 1999) and from the census of Ireland. Censuses in Ireland before 1841 are not considered complete or reliable.

Tourism
Tory Island has a number of sites connected with historical events and island mythology:

 Dún Bhaloir (“Balor's Fort”) is located on the island's eastern side, on a peninsula surrounded on three sides by  cliffs. The fort is accessible only by crossing a narrow isthmus that is defended by four earthen embankments.

 An Eochair Mhór (the “Big Key”) is a long, steep-sided spur jutting from the east side of the peninsula and ending in a crag called An Tor Mór (the “Big Rock” or the “Big Tower”). The spur has prominent rocky pinnacles known as “Balor's soldiers” (Saighdiúirí Bhaloir). They give the spur a 'toothed' appearance, helping to inspire the name “the Big Key”.

 The Wishing Stone is a precipitous, flat-topped rock alongside the northern cliff-face of Balor's Fort. Traditionally, a wish is granted to anyone foolhardy enough to step onto the rock, and also to anyone who succeeds in throwing three stones onto it.
 An Cloigtheach (the “Bell Tower”) is the largest structure to have survived the 16th-century destruction of the monastery (see history section above). The round tower was built in the 6th or 7th century.
 The Tau Cross (a T-shaped cross) is believed to date from the 12th century. It is one of only two Tau crosses in Ireland (the other is in Kilnaboy, County Clare).
 Móirsheisear (“Grave of the Seven”): Móirsheisear (which literally means “big six”, but is nevertheless a term signifying seven) is the tomb of seven people, six men and one woman, who drowned when their boat capsized off Scoilt an Mhóirsheisear (the “Cleft of the Seven”) on the island's northwest coast. According to local superstition, clay from the woman's grave has the power to ward off vermin.
 The Lighthouse, standing at the west end of the island, was built between 1828 and 1832 based on a design by George Halpin, a noted designer of Irish lighthouses. In April 1990, the lighthouse was automated. It is one of three lighthouses in Ireland into which a reference station for the Differential Global Positioning System (DGPS) has been installed. The lighthouse is at coordinates 
 The Torpedo: A torpedo can be seen midway between An Baile Thiar and An Baile Thoir. It washed ashore during World War II and was then defused and moved to its present location.

Flora and fauna
The island is a designated “Important Bird Area”. It is a breeding site for corn crakes (Crex crex), a globally threatened species whose numbers have fallen as agriculture has intensified. In 2007, Tory Island recorded 18 calling males, down from a recorded maximum of 34 calling males in 2003. In 2010, numbers dropped down further to 10. In addition to its indigenous birdlife, the island records many vagrants.

Ancient records of the flora and fauna of this island can be found in Hyndman's notes on the history of the island. Algae found locally include: Fucus vesiculosus, Fucus nodosus, Himanthalia lorea, Laminaria digitata, Rhodomenia laciniata, Plocamium coccineum, Ptilota plumosa, Conferva rupestrus, Codium tomentosum, Codium adhaerens det Dr Harvey.

Because of its high winds, the island has no trees.

Tory Island Cattle are a rare breed of cattle from Tory Island.

See also
 List of abbeys and priories in County Donegal

Further reading

References

 
Cloughaneely
Gaeltacht places in County Donegal
Important Bird Areas of the Republic of Ireland
Lighthouses in the Republic of Ireland
National Monuments in County Donegal